Yukul or Jukul may refer to:
 Yukul people, an ethic group of Australia
 Yukul language, an extinct Australian language

See also 
 Yucul
 Yugul (disambiguation)
 Yukulta

Language and nationality disambiguation pages